Qaleh-ye Hendu may refer to:
 Qaleh-ye Hendu, Khvaf
 Qaleh-ye Hendu, Taybad